The Bass River, a perennial river of the Western Port catchment, is located in the West Gippsland region of the Australian state of Victoria.

Location and features
The river flows generally south by west, joined by one minor tributary, before reaching its river mouth and emptying into the Western Port, west of the town of  within the Bass Coast Shire. The river descends  over its combined  course.

The river is traversed by the Bass Highway near the town of Bass.

Etymology
In the Aboriginal Boonwurrung language the river is given two names, Weandon yallock, with yallock meaning "river" or creek", and Tullungurn, with no defined meeting.

The river is now named in honour of George Bass, who came to the river and surrounding area in January 1798 on his "whaleboat" expedition of the southeast coast of Australia.

See also

 Rivers of Victoria

References

External links
  website
 

Melbourne Water catchment
Rivers of Gippsland (region)
Western Port